Fenoarivo Afovoany is a district of Bongolava in Madagascar.

Communes
The district is further divided into eight communes; which are further sub-divided into 101 fokontany:

 Ambatomainty Atsimo
 Ambohitromby
 Fenoarivobe (also called: Fenoarivo-Afovoany)
 Firavahana
 Kiranomena
 Mahajeby
 Morarano Marotampona
 Tsinjoarivo

References 

Districts of Bongolava